The Laws of Physics (Science & Discovery) is a book by Milton A. Rothman, published in 1963. It describes some fundamental laws of physics in language that is both easy and pleasant to read.

References

Popular physics books
1963 non-fiction books